Gilmer Neely Capps (January 18, 1932 – August 27, 2019) was an American politician in the state of Oklahoma. His parents were J. Gilmer and Mary Neely Capps of Tipton, Oklahoma. He was raised in Snyder, Oklahoma, where he graduated from high school.

Capps was a farmer/rancher and alumnus of Oklahoma State University. He was elected to the Oklahoma State Senate in 1969 for the 26th district and served until he retired in 2006. While serving in the Senate, he had also served as Chair of the Southern Legislative Conference. He had been named as Dean of the Oklahoma Senate prior to his retirement.

Capps was married to Wanda Lou Miller from January 27, 1951, until her death in December 2007. Gilmer and Wanda had two children who survived their parents, Cynda C. Ottoway (Larry D.) and Gilmer John Capps (Darcy).

In 2008, Capps married Shirley Griffin, who survived him, and the couple moved from Snyder to Frederick, Oklahoma. Besides Shirley, other family survivors included his daughter and son, one granddaughter, and one great granddaughter. 

He died on August 27, 2019. After a funeral at the First Baptist Church of Snyder, he was buried in Fairlawn Cemetery at Snyder.

Notes

References

1932 births
2019 deaths
Democratic Party Oklahoma state senators
People from Tillman County, Oklahoma
People from Kiowa County, Oklahoma